İnci is a Turkish surname. Notable people with the surname include:

 Arman İnci (born 1991), Turkish-German actor
 Nazlıcan İnci (born 2000), Turkish badminton player

See also
 İnci Sözlük, Turkish interactive dictionary

Turkish-language surnames